Francis Scott Key Memorial is a park and memorial located in the District of Columbia neighborhood of Georgetown; at the intersection of 34th and M Streets, NW. This 0.77 acre (3,104 m²) site is administered by the National Park Service as a part of Rock Creek Park but is not contiguous with that park. Situated adjacent to the northeast corner of the Francis Scott Key Bridge, the park abuts to Chesapeake and Ohio Canal Towpath.

History 
At the time of the establishment of Washington, D.C., Francis Scott Key Park was located within the existing municipality of Georgetown in Montgomery County, Maryland. The land was acquired by the National Capital Park Commission pursuant to the Capper-Crampton Act of May 29, 1930.
The park was dedicated to Francis Scott Key, author of "The Star-Spangled Banner", and donated by the Francis Scott Key Foundation to the National Park Service in 1993.

Landmarks and features
At the center of the park is a brownstone brick plaza covered by a limestone pergola draped in wisteria. The centerpiece is a bronze bust of Francis Scott Key by sculptor Betty Mailhouse Dunston. To the sides are interpretative signs. Within the park flies a 15-star, 15-Stripe replica of the flag that flew over Fort McHenry when Key wrote The Star-Spangled Banner.

References

External links
 
 National Park Service: Francis Scott Key Memorial
 The Cultural Landscape Foundation

Parks in Washington, D.C.
National Park Service areas in Washington, D.C.
Urban public parks
Rock Creek Park
Protected areas established in 1993
1993 establishments in Washington, D.C.
Monuments and memorials in Washington, D.C.
Memorial